Bay City High School is a public high school located on Texas State Highway 35 on the western edge of Bay City, Texas, United States.

School
The school opened a new campus in 2002.

During the 2015–16 school year, there were 1,002 students enrolled in BCHS.  Demographics at the school were as follows: White 24.0%, African American 15.3%, Hispanic 58.0%, Asian/Pacific Islander 1.3%, American Indian/Alaskan Native 0.2%, two or more races 1.3%.  58.9% were classified as economically disadvantaged.

Academics
For the 2015–16 school year, Bay City High School was rated "Met Standard" by the Texas Education Agency.

The school offers a curriculum in line with Texas state standards. Additional college prep programs include Advanced Placement or dual-credit courses, which are taken via Wharton County Junior College and AVID.
A number of career and technical programs are available to Bay City students, including articulated courses with Wharton County Junior College and certifications in Cosmetology–Human Services, OSHA and    Career Safe–Construction/Career Prep, CPR, Pharmacy Technician, Certified Nurse Aide–Health Science, Welding-Manufacturing, Microsoft Office Work–Business Management, and Manage First; ServSafe–Hospitality.

College entrance
Many BCHS students are offered scholarships by Wharton County Junior College. Texas offers automatic college admissions to high school seniors who are in the top ten percent of their graduating class, determined by grade point average. The Bay City High School class of 2009 was awarded over one million dollars in scholarships.

Extracurricular activities
Student groups and activities at Bay City may include but are not limited to:
Band
Cheerleading
Choir
Dance Team
DECA
Drama
Dungeoneers
Educators Rising
Fellowship of Christian Athletes
FFA
Flag Corps
HOSA
Interact
Key Club
National Honor Society
Spanish Club
Speech and Debate
Student Council
VICA
Yearbook

Past state championship titles include:
One-Act Play: 1999 (4A), 2003 (4A)
Team Debate: 2006 (4A), 2008 (4A)

Athletics
BCHS is classified as a division 4A high school by the University Interscholastic League. The athletic director is Patrick Matthews.

The schools athletic teams, known as the Blackcats (bearing the power-cat logo), compete in:
Baseball
Basketball
Cross Country
Football
Golf
Powerlifting
Soccer
World Series Poker
Softball
Swim
Tennis
Track
Volleyball

Past state championship titles include:
Boys' basketball: 1985 (4A)
Football: 1983 (4A), 2000 (4A Division I)
Boys Track & Field: 1979 (3A), 1984 (4A), 1990 (4A)

Notable alumni
Forrest Bess, painter
LaBradford Smith, professional basketball player
Joe DeLoach, Gold Medalist in track, 1988 Summer Olympics
Tracy Freeman, American Trial Lawyer
Hart Lee Dykes, former NFL player
Simon Fletcher, former NFL player, Denver Broncos
Ricardo Ramirez, Bishop of Las Cruces

References

External links
 Bay City High School

Public high schools in Texas
Schools in Matagorda County, Texas